Qandak-e Khurdeh Malkin (also Romanized as Qandaḵ-e Khūrdeh Mālḵīn) is a village in Zam Rural District, Pain Jam District, Torbat-e Jam County, Razavi Khorasan Province, Iran. At the 2006 census, its population was 281, in 60 families.

References 

Populated places in Torbat-e Jam County